Ovsyannikov is a Russian masculine surname, its feminine counterpart is Ovsyannikova. It may refer to
Aleksandr Ovsyannikov (born 1974), Russian footballer 
Anastasiya Ovsyannikova (born 1988), Russian Paralympic athlete 
Denys Ovsyannikov (born 1984), Ukrainian futsal player 
Dmitry Ovsyannikov (born 1977), Russian politician
Filipp Ovsyannikov (1827–1906), Russian histologist and the founder of sturgeon breeding in Russia
Ksenia Ovsyannikova (born 1985), Russian wheelchair fencer
Marina Ovsyannikova (born 1978), Russian TV producer
Mikhail Ovsyannikov (1915–1987), Soviet philosopher and academic 
Oleg Ovsyannikov (born 1970), Russian ice dancer 
Vladimir Ovsyannikov (born 1961), Russian politician 
Yaroslav Ovsyannikov (born 1993), Russian football player 
Yevgeni Ovsyannikov (born 1982), Russian footballer

Russian-language surnames